Doké is a town in western Ivory Coast. It is a sub-prefecture of Bloléquin Department in Cavally Region, Montagnes District.

Doké was a commune until March 2012, when it became one of 1126 communes nationwide that were abolished.

In 2014, the population of the sub-prefecture of Doké was 13,357.

Villages
The 9 villages of the sub-prefecture of Doké and their population in 2014 are:

References

Sub-prefectures of Cavally Region
Former communes of Ivory Coast